Queen Hyosun (효순왕후 조씨; 8 January 1716 – 30 December 1751), of the Pungyang Jo clan, was the crown princess of Joseon. She was never known by the title queen during her lifetime. Both Hyosun and her husband were posthumously made the adoptive parents of the future King Jeongjo in 1764, in an attempt to distance the boy from the crimes of his birth father, Crown Prince Sado. She was posthumously called as Hyosun, the Bright Empress (효순소황후, 孝純昭皇后).

Biography
Lady Jo was born into the Pungyang Jo clan during King Sukjong’s 14th year of reign as the eldest daughter of Jo Mun-myeong, a government official aligned with the Soron faction, and his second wife, Lady Yi of the Jeonju Yi clan, the royal house of Joseon. Through her paternal grandmother, Lady Jo is a first cousin removed of Queen Ingyeong; the first wife of her father-in-law’s father, King Sukjong. 

Through a selection process, the 11-year-old Lady Jo was chosen to become the crown princess in 1727 and married the 8-year-old Crown Prince Hyojang that same year. On such occasion, her father-in-law, King Yeongjo, gifted her a book of instructions that he had written. 

On 16 December 1728, Hyosun's husband died of an unknown illness when she was 12 years old. Despite this happening, she was still given the title of Hyeonbin or Crown Princess Consort Hyeon (Hangul: 현빈, Hanja: 賢嬪) in 1735. 

Eventually in 1744, Lady Jo was given the title of Lady Hyeonbin (현빈궁, 賢嬪宮; lit. ‘Hyeonbin Palace’) as she was no longer the crown princess consort through her marriage. Despite being widowed, she remained in the palace and reportedly developed a good relationship with the wife of the new crown prince, Crown Princess Consort Hye. 

It is also said that King Yeongjo had favored and seen Hyosun as another daughter like Princess Hwapyeong. Outliving her husband by 23 years, Hyosun later died at the age of 35 in the winter on 30 December 1751. King Yeongjo, who was reportedly deeply saddened by her death, led the mourning rites.

Posthumous treatment
Hyosun was initially granted the posthumous title of Hyosun, the Virtuous Crown Princess Consort and venerated in the same temple as her deceased husband. Her brother-in-law, Crown Prince Sado, was killed in 1762 for his actions which prompted Yeongjo to issue a decree that made Hyosun and Hyojang the adoptive parents of Sado's eldest son; in a move seen as an attempt to preserve the boy's legitimacy as a heir. The year of King Jeongjo's succession in 1776, the princess consort thus received the posthumous title of Queen Hyosun with her husband receiving King Jinjong as his posthumous title.

After 157 years, Queen Hyosun was granted the title of Hyosun, the Bright Empress in 1908 when Emperor Sunjong succeeded to the throne.

Family
 Great-great-great-great-grandfather 
 Jo Gi (조기, 趙磯)
 Great-great-great-grandfather 
 Jo Hui-bo (조희보, 趙希輔)
 Great-great-grandfather 
 Jo Hyeong (조형, 趙珩) (1606 - 1679)
 Adoptive great-great-grandfather: Jo Min (조민, 趙珉); older brother to Jo Hyeong
 Great-great-grandmother 
 Lady Mok of the Sacheon Mok clan (사천 목씨, 泗川 睦氏); second daughter of Mok Jang-heum (목장흠, 睦長欽; 1572 - 1641)
 Great-grandfather 
 Jo Sang-jeong (조상정, 趙相鼎)
 Great-grandmother 
 Lady Hong of the Namyang Hong clan (남양 홍씨); daughter of Hong Myeong-il (홍명일, 洪命一)
Grandfather
 Jo In-su (조인수,  趙仁壽) (1648–1692); was a prime minister
Grandmother
 Lady Kim of the Gwangsan Kim clan (증 정경부인 광산 김씨, 贈 貞敬夫人 光山 金氏) (1649–1722);  daughter of Kim Ik-hui (김익희, 金益熙; 1610-1656)
Father
Jo Mun-myeong (1680–1732) (조문명, 趙景命)
 Uncle: Jo Gyeong-myeong (조경명, 趙景命) (1674 - 1726)
 Aunt: Lady Kim of the Andong Kim clan (안동 김씨, 安東 金氏)
 Uncle: Jo Yeong-myeong (조영명, 趙令命) (1674 - 1722)
 Aunt: Lady Sim of the Cheongseong Sim clan (청송 심씨, 靑松 沈氏)
 Uncle: Jo Hyeon-myeong (조현명, 趙顯命) (1690 - 1752)
 Aunt: Lady Yun of the Chilwon Yun clan (증 정경부인 칠원 윤씨, 贈 貞敬夫人 漆原 尹氏)
 Aunt: Lady Kim of the Andong Kim clan (정경부인 안동 김씨, 貞敬夫人 安東 沈氏)
Mother
 Step-mother: Internal Princess Consort Hwawon of the Andong Kim clan (화원부부인 안동 김씨, 花原府夫人 安東 金氏) (1681 - 1710)
 Step-grandfather: Kim Chang-eob (김창업, 金昌業) (1658 - 1722)
 Unnamed step-grandmother; Kim Chang-eob’s concubine
 Biological mother: Internal Princess Consort Wanheung of the Jeonju Yi clan (? - 1734) (완흥부부인 전주 이씨, 完興府夫人 全州 李氏)
Grandfather: Yi Sang-baek (이상백, 李相伯) (1648–1721); genealogically an adopted 7th great-grandson of Prince Yangnyeong (biologically an 8th great-grandson of Jeongjong of Joseon)
Grandmother: Lady Shin of the Goryeong Shin clan (고령 신씨, 高靈 申氏)
 Siblings 
 Older half-brother: Jo Jae-ho (조재호, 趙載浩) (1702 - 1762)
 Sister-in-law: Lady Won of the Wonju Won clan (원주 원씨, 原州 元氏); daughter of Won Myeong-gu (원명구, 元命龜)
 Older half-brother: Jo Jae-yeon (조재연, 趙載淵) or Jo Jae-hun (조재혼, 趙載混) (1709 - 1750)
 Sister-in-law: Lady Seong of the Changnyeong Seong clan (창녕 성씨, 昌寧 成氏); daughter of Seong Deok-jang (성덕장, 成德章)
 Older brother: Jo Jae-heung (조재홍, 趙載洪) (1713 - 1758)
 Sister-in-law: Lady Yi of the Deoksu Yi clan (덕수 이씨, 德水 李氏); daughter of Yi Hui-dam (이희담, 李喜聃)
 Younger brother: Jo Jae-bu (조재부, 趙載溥) or Jo Si-bu (조시부, 趙時溥) (1720 - 1776)
 Sister-in-law: Lady Jo of the Changnyeong Jo clan (창녕 조씨, 昌寧 曺氏); daughter of Jo Myeong-gyo (조명교, 曺命敎)
 Younger sister: Lady Jo of the Pungyang Jo clan (조씨, 趙氏)
Husband
Yi Haeng, King Jinjong (4 April 1719 – 16 December 1728) (진종 조선)
 Father-in-law: Yi Geum, King Yeongjo of Joseon (영조 조선) (31 October 1694 - 22 April 1776)
 Mother-in-law: Royal Noble Consort Jeong of the Hamseong Yi clan (정빈 함성 이씨) (1694 - November 1721)
 Legal mother-in-law: Queen Jeongseong of the Daegu Seo clan (정성왕후 서씨) (12 January 1693 - 3 April 1757)
 Issue
Adoptive son: Yi San, King Jeongjo of Joseon (28 October 1752 – 18 August 1800) (정조 조선)
 Adoptive daughter-in-law: Queen Hyoui of the Cheongpung Kim clan (효의선황후 김씨) (5 January 1754 - 10 April 1821)

References

Notes

Works

18th-century Korean people
1716 births
1751 deaths
Royal consorts of the Joseon dynasty
Korean queens consort
Korean posthumous empresses
People from Seoul
Pungyang Jo clan